5β-Pregnane, also known as 17β-ethyletiocholane or as 10β,13β-dimethyl-17β-ethyl-5β-gonane, is a steroid and a parent compound of a variety of steroid derivatives. It is one of the epimers of pregnane, the other being 5α-pregnane. Derivatives of 5β-pregnane include the naturally occurring steroids 5β-dihydroprogesterone, pregnanolone, epipregnanolone, pregnanediol, and pregnanetriol, and the synthetic steroids hydroxydione, renanolone, ORG-20599, and SAGE-217. These derivatives include metabolites of progesterone and endogenous and synthetic neurosteroids.

See also
 5α-Pregnane
 Etiocholane
 Gonane

References

5β-Pregnanes
Endocrinology